Căpâlna may refer to several places in Romania:

Căpâlna, a commune in Bihor County
Căpâlna, a village in Săsciori Commune, Alba County
Căpâlna de Jos, a village in Jidvei Commune, Alba County
Căpâlna, a village in Gâlgău Commue, Sălaj County
Căpâlna de Sus, a village in Mica Commune, Mureș County